Black-Ash Inheritance is the second EP by Swedish heavy metal band In Flames, released in 1997. It was released as a preview of their upcoming album Whoracle. Its tracks were later included in the Japanese release of Whoracle as well as the later reissue of The Jester Race.

The title is a lyric from the song "Dead God in Me" from The Jester Race.

The "Acoustic Medley" is a medley of three In Flames songs; "Artifacts of the Black Rain" (The Jester Race), "Dead Eternity" (The Jester Race) and "Jotun" (Whoracle).

In 2007, Black-Ash Inheritance was re-released as a shaped mini-LP by Night of the Vinyl Dead Records, limited to 555 copies.

Track listing

Personnel

In Flames
Anders Fridén – vocals, percussion
Glenn Ljungström – guitar
Jesper Strömblad – guitar, keyboards, percussion
Johan Larsson – bass
Bjorn Gelotte – drums, percussion

In Flames albums
1997 EPs
Nuclear Blast EPs
Albums produced by Fredrik Nordström